C'mon Kids is the fifth album by the Boo Radleys, released in September 1996. The album is considered to be purposely difficult and uncommercial. The band were said to have wanted to distance themselves from the commercial image they had cultivated because of the unexpected successes of the album Wake Up! and their top ten hit single "Wake Up Boo!". However, this was not the intention of the band, as explained by Sice in an interview in 2005:

Production
C'mon Kids was recorded at Rockfield Studios in Wales in January and February 1996, with the band acting as producers. Andy Wilkinson stood in as engineer, with assistance from Paul Reed. Sean Slade and Paul Kolderie mixed the album at Fort Apache Studios in Cambridge, Massachusetts, in March 1996.

Promotion
Creation Records marketing manager John Andrews thought it would be an attempt at prolonging the band's lifespan; guitarist Martin Carr was optimistic that the album would be a popular seller, though it might take repeated listens to sink in. Andy Saunders, who had been re-hired as the band's publicist after previously being fired, was less hopeful for the album. Mark Sutherland, the features editor for NME, told Saunders that there was only a single way to approach the album from a journalistic standpoint: They were a pop band who had success and now they're not. That's the only story that any decent journalist is going to write about this album.' It died on its arse."

Though it lacked a song similar to "Wake Up Boo!" to boost sales, "What's in the Box?" was playlisted for BBC Radio 1 and promptly championed by radio presenter Simon Mayo. In preparation for a tour of the UK, the band learned that Creation Records had vetoed several of their proposals, such as declining support from DJ Propellerheads, who were intended to give the shows a Screamadelica-type atmosphere, for monetary reasons. Carr explained that while the members individually had some money, the band as a whole was lacking in funds. As a result, they decided to support other acts, such as Suede for their European tour in October 1996.

Reception

The album was less successful than its predecessor, charting at #20 on the UK albums chart. It did however spawn three UK top 40 singles, "What's In The Box? (See Whatcha Got)" at #25, "C'mon Kids" at #18 (their second and last UK top 20 single), and a radio edit of "Ride The Tiger" (shortened by over three minutes from the album version) made #38. Journalist David Cavanagh wrote that they "lost 100,000 fans" with the album, and "returned to being a cult band".

In his book Turn on Your Mind: Four Decades of Great Psychedelic Rock, writer Jim DeRogatis ranked C'Mon Kids at number 110 in his list "The Ultimate Psychedelic Rock Library: One-Hundred Eighty-Nine Albums You Can't Live Without." Music journalist Mark Beaumont said the album "deserved the edict of 'post Britpop classic'", while Cavanagh referred to it as "harsh and uncompromising".

C'mon Kids is the all-time favourite album of Tom White of The Electric Soft Parade, a band influenced by the album. According to Martin Sainsbury of Drowned in Sound, Nicky Wire of Manic Street Preachers also listened to "little else for a year," whereas Radiohead "went back to the drawing board when hearing it during the OK Computer sessions."

Track listing
All songs written by Martin Carr.

2010 reissue CD2

 Tracks 1–6 from the "What's in the Box? (See Whatcha Got)" single
 Tracks 7–12 from the "C'mon Kids" single
 Tracks 13–18 from the "Ride the Tiger" single

Personnel
Personnel per booklet.

The Boo Radleys
 Sice – vocals
 Rob Cieka – drums
 Tim Brown – bass
 Martin Carr – guitar

Production and design
 The Boo Radleys – producer
 Andy Wilkinson – engineer
 Paul Read – assistant
 Sean Slade – mixing
 Paul Kolderie – mixing
 Tom Sheehan – photography
 Steve Gullick – photography
 Roger Sargent – photography
 Lollinger – outer artwork
 Toby Egelnick – design, layout

References
Citations

Sources

External links

C'mon Kids at YouTube (streamed copy where licensed)

1996 albums
The Boo Radleys albums
Creation Records albums
Albums recorded at Rockfield Studios
Art rock albums by English artists
Psychedelic rock albums by English artists
Progressive rock albums by English artists